Dawley Hamlets is a civil parish in the district of Telford and Wrekin, Shropshire, England.  The parish contains 14 listed buildings that are recorded in the National Heritage List for England.  All the listed buildings are designated at Grade II, the lowest of the three grades, which is applied to "buildings of national importance and special interest".  The parish includes the settlements of Dawley, Doseley, and Horsehay.  The listed buildings include houses and cottages, a farmhouse, a former canal aqueduct and bridge, a chapel, a church, offices, and a railway bridge.


Buildings

References

Citations

Sources

Lists of buildings and structures in Shropshire